Stettynskloof Dam is a combined earth-fill/rock-fill type dam located on the Stettynskloof River in South Africa. It serves mainly for municipal and industrial use and its hazard potential has been ranked high (3).

See also
List of reservoirs and dams in South Africa

References 

 List of South African Dams from the Department of Water Affairs and Forestry (South Africa)

Dams in South Africa